Marjery Bryce (1891 - 1973) was a British suffragette and actor,  rode dressed as Joan of Arc in WSPU parades in support of votes for women.

Family 
Born Margaret Vincentia on 18 June 1891 in Marylebone, London, to politician father John Annan Bryce and mother Violet L'Estrange.

Bryce was variously known as Marjery, Marjorie or Marjery Vincentia and Marjorie Annan.

She had two brothers and a sister three years younger, Rosalind L'Estrange, known as 'Tiny'.  One brother, Nigel, died at the age of nineteen. Her other brother Roland, was later to be one of the commissioners in 1922 to lay out the borders for Yugoslavia.

Her father was Liberal MP for the Inverness Burghs, voted against the Conciliation Bill which was to give some women the franchise and wrote letters to the press against women's suffrage. Her mother, Violet held the opposite view and was a cousin to Countess Markievicz and Eva Gore-Booth, both activists for women's rights.

Bryce remained single.

Role in Women's Suffrage movement 

Bryce joined the Women's Social and Political Union (WSPU) parade at the age of nineteen  was portraying 'the perfect woman'  riding on a white horse dressed in full armour with a banner in the style of Joan of Arc, leading the forty thousand strong Women's Procession on 17 June 1911, before  George V's Coronation. Her sister  Rosalind "Tiny" Bryce was dressed as a page and led the horse's bridle. This demonstration was to encourage support of the proposed Conciliation Bill, which would have given the franchise to women who owned property.

The image of Saint Joan was seen to represent  'the militant women's ideal....in every act of hers they recognize the same spirit as that which strengthens them to risk their liberty and endure torture for the sake of freedom'.  And the leaders of WSPU, Emmeline and Christabel Pankhurst, Emmeline Pethick-Lawrence and Mabel Tuke led the parade, with groups of women's trades and professions, or, like Bryce, dressed as famous women from the past. Christabel in particular felt the image of Joan of Arc included the willingness to undertake physical hardship  and emphasised the martial (masculine) qualities as an image of fighting for a cause of right. This was summed up a ' the loveliness of simplicity, purity, courage and militancy' which Bryce was acting in this parade and was an image used by WSPU as a symbol.

The Museum of London has the original copyright image of Bryce as Joan of Arc cited in many of the references above.

In other suffragette parades, Joan of Arc was also portrayed by Elsie Howey.

Acting career 

Bryce played the London stage  for example, in the role of Nina Zarechnaya in The Seagull (1919), appeared in The Cloud that Lifted (1932) after performing in Other Gates in the Grafton Theatre, London in 1931,  and was the Red Queen in Alice in Wonderland (in 1938 and again in1947).

In 1927 she took the role of 'The Spirit of Henley' in the Henley Historical Pageant.

Her entry in 1939 'The Spotlight'  theatrical casting directory describes her as a straight, comedy or character performer.

Bryce was later known for her roles in Agatha Christie's Ten Little Niggers (1949),  appearing in BBC Sunday-Night Theatre (1950s) and appeared in a BBC series The Bell Family (1951 ).

Death 
Bryce died on 8 June 1973, in Fulham London.

References 

20th-century British actresses
1891 births
1973 deaths
Women's Social and Political Union
British women's rights activists
People from Marylebone
20th-century French women